The Festival of the Laurels is a festival in Colombia. The festival takes place in the town of Distraccion, in the Department of La Guajira. The festival is folkloric event and celebrates the vallenato music. The festival was named after the Laurel trees planted at the main plaza in downtown Distraccion.

See also

List of music festivals in Colombia 
List of festivals in La Guajira
List of folk festivals
Festivals in Colombia

References

 

Music festivals in Colombia
Festivals in La Guajira Department
Folk festivals in Colombia